Tibor Joza (born 10 August 1986 in Halmstad) is a Swedish football player of Hungarian descent, who played as a defender. Joza has played for the Sweden U21s once, in a friendly 2-1 loss against Malta U21.

He started his career in IF Leikin, in 2002 he was signed by Halmstads BK, making his debut for the senior team in 2004. He was linked to Danish Kolding FC, however in December 2007 he signed a contract with Falkenbergs FF in Superettan. Following two successful seasons with Falkenberg he attracted the attention of Allsvenskan again and on November 10, 2010 BK Häcken confirmed the signing of Joza.

References

External links
Halmstads BK profile 
 

1986 births
Living people
Sportspeople from Halmstad
Swedish footballers
Sweden under-21 international footballers
Sweden youth international footballers
Swedish people of Hungarian descent
Halmstads BK players
Falkenbergs FF players
BK Häcken players
Östers IF players
Superettan players
Allsvenskan players
Association football defenders
Sportspeople from Halland County